The girls' 5 kilometre walk event at the 2014 Summer Youth Olympics was held on 23 August 2014 in Nanjing Olympic Sports Center.

Schedule

Results

Final

Intermediate times:

External links
 iaaf.org - Women's 5 km walk
 Nanjing 2014 - Athletics Official Results Book
 

Athletics at the 2014 Summer Youth Olympics